The Chipuxet River is a river in the U.S. state of Rhode Island. There are two dams along the river's length.

The river is used as the main drinking water supply for the University of Rhode Island. Due to heavy water demands on the river, it has been known to run dry at times.

Course
The river rises from what is now Slocum Reservoir in Exeter. From there it flows south past the University of Rhode Island, through South Kingstown to its mouth at Worden Pond.

Crossings
Below is a list of all crossings over the Chipuxet River. The list starts at the headwaters and goes downstream.
North Kingstown
Railroad Avenue
Exeter
Bridge Ridge Road
Dorset Mill Road
Yawgoo Valley Road
Wolf Rock Road
South Kingstown
Kingstown Road (RI 138)

Tributaries
The Chipuxet River has no named tributaries, though many unnamed streams feed it.

See also
List of rivers in Rhode Island

References
Maps from the United States Geological Survey

Rivers of Washington County, Rhode Island
North Kingstown, Rhode Island
South Kingstown, Rhode Island
Exeter, Rhode Island
Rivers of Rhode Island
Tributaries of Pawcatuck River
Wild and Scenic Rivers of the United States